Wax & Gold is the fifth album by singer-songwriter Tracy Bonham. It was released on August 21, 2015.

Track listing
All songs written by Tracy Bonham (except *= written by Tracy Bonham and Kevin Salem)

"Noonday Demon"
"Luck"*
"Wax & Gold"
"This Here's My Grandpa's Guitar"
"Oh McKenzie Silver Water"
"GoneGoneGone"
"Black Tears"
"From the Tree to the Hand to the Page"
"Under the Ruby Moon"
"LoveLoveLoveLoveLove"*
"One of These Days"

Personnel
Tracy Bonham – Vocals, Violins, Piano, Hammond Organ
Kevin Salem – Guitar, Banjo, Dobro
Mike DuClos – Electric Bass and Upright Bass
Joe Magistro – Drums and Percussion
Jay Collins – Flute and Baritone Sax  on 1
Amy Helm – Vocals on 8
Langhorne Slim – Vocals on 8 and 10
Aaron Freeman – Vocals on 1

Production
Producer: Kevin Salem
Mixed by Kevin Salem
Cover photography by Sherwin Lainez

References

Tracy Bonham albums
2015 albums